Tiquisate is a town, with a population of 29,193 (2018 census), and a municipality in the Escuintla department of Guatemala.  The area is a major center of banana production, and the Tiquisate banana workers formed Guatemala's first private sector union in 1944.

Tiquisate Municipality has a population of 57,292 in 2018, up from 33,667 in 1994.

References

Municipalities of the Escuintla Department